A knot garden is a garden of formal design in a square frame, consisting of a variety of aromatic plants and culinary herbs including germander, marjoram, thyme, southernwood, lemon balm, hyssop, costmary, acanthus, mallow, chamomile, rosemary, Calendula, Viola and Santolina. Most knot gardens now have edges made from box (Buxus sempervirens), which is easily cut into desired shapes, like dense miniature hedges, and stays green during winters when not all of the "filling" plants are visible or attractive. The paths in between are usually laid with fine gravel. However, the original designs of knot gardens did not have the low box hedges, and knot gardens with such hedges might more accurately be called parterres.

Most Renaissance knot gardens were composed of square compartments. A small garden might consist of one compartment, while large gardens might contain six or eight compartments.

Characteristics 
Knot gardens were based on Renaissance designs that were used in forms of indoor decoration such as textiles, carpets, wall coverings and cushions. They are often designed to be viewed from above and encompass an interlocking or intertwining pattern using clipped common box, Buxus sempervirens.

Unlike like French parterres, knot gardens are usually small and of varying heights where hedges form junctions to indicate the crossing or knotting of 'threads.'

Examples

Knot gardens were first established in England in the reign of Queen Elizabeth I.

Some early knot gardens have been covered over by lawn or other landscaping, but the original traces are still visible as undulations in the present day landscape.  An example of this phenomenon is the early 17th-century garden of Muchalls Castle in Scotland.

Knot gardens have become established in many temperate formal gardens throughout the world, including:
 Alexandra Hicks Herb Knot Garden, University of Michigan, USA
 Antony House, Cornwall, England
 Anzac Square, Dunedin, New Zealand
 Astley Castle, Warwickshire, England
 Barnsley House, Gloucestershire, England
 Bourton House Garden, Gloucestershire, England
 Brooklyn Botanic Garden, New York City, USA
 Cleveland Botanical Garden, USA
 Compton Castle, Devon, England
 Garden Museum, London, England
 Hatfield House, Hertfordshire, England
 Helmingham Hall, Suffolk, England
 Knowle, Solihull, England
 Little Moreton Hall, Cheshire, England
 Red Lodge Museum, Bristol, England
 St Fagans, South Wales
 Stoneleigh Abbey, Warwickshire, England
 Sudeley Castle, Cotswolds, England

A knot garden is featured in Shakespeare's play Love's Labour's Lost.

See also
 List of garden types
 Gardens of the French Renaissance
 Garden à la française

References

External links
 
 The Knot Garden in the Garden Museum, London

Types of garden
Herb gardens
Garden features